The following is a comprehensive list of awards and nominations received by Ozuna, a Puerto Rican Latin trap and reggaeton singer who is regarded as the "New King of Reggaeton". Ozuna has won two Latin Grammy Awards—both for "Yo x Ti, Tu x Mi"—from ten nominations, as well as five Billboard Music Awards, twelve Billboard Latin Music Awards, six Latin American Music Awards, eìght Lo Nuestro Awards, and four Guinness World Records.

Awards and nominations

References 

Ozuna
Awards